Charlie Herbert Rose (19 March 1872–1949) was an English footballer who played in the Football League for Derby County and Loughborough.

References

1872 births
1949 deaths
English footballers
Association football forwards
English Football League players
Derby St Luke's F.C. players
Derby Midland F.C. players
Derby County F.C. players
Kettering Town F.C. players
Ilkeston Town F.C. (1880s) players
Loughborough F.C. players
Whitwick White Cross F.C. players
Ilkeston United F.C. players